Frank Dobson (born 11 June 1934) is a British former sports shooter. He competed in the 50 metre pistol event at the 1960 Summer Olympics.

References

1934 births
Living people
British male sport shooters
Olympic shooters of Great Britain
Shooters at the 1960 Summer Olympics
People from New Malden
Sportspeople from London